Brayton Bowman is an American singer-songwriter. Born in Philadelphia, he attended the Philadelphia High School for Creative & Performing Arts where he studied classical and choral music and dabbled in musical theatre. After high school he studied jazz at Berklee College of Music, then moved to New York City in February 2015, where he released the four-track EP HERE/NOW, leading to Spin Magazine naming him one of 5 Artists To Watch in May.

He is perhaps best known for his noirish cover of Britney Spears' "...Baby One More Time" in April 2015, which was remixed by DJ Wizza & OVSN, and a mashup of Justin Bieber’s “What Do You Mean?” and Drake’s “Hotline Bling” in October of that year. Now based in Los Angeles, he released a second EP, The Update, in August 2015.

Inspired by classic artists like Stevie Wonder and Amy Winehouse, Bowman describes his sound as "somewhere in between soul-pop and future-funk."

The popular June 2016 video "Shy," by The Magician featuring Brayton Bowman, gained notoriety in part because of its bisexual imagery. Bowman's September 2016 single "What's Really Good" was produced by MNEK. He co-wrote MNEK's single “At Night I Think About You,” released on Capitol Records UK in May 2016.

Discography

Mixtapes

Extended plays

Singles

as lead artist

as featured artist

Songwriting Credits

References

Singer-songwriters from Pennsylvania
American male singer-songwriters
Living people
Year of birth missing (living people)
American LGBT musicians
21st-century American LGBT people